The Lifted Veil is a 1917 American silent drama film produced by B. A. Rolfe and distributed by Metro Pictures. It is based on a 1917 novel The Lifted Veil by Basil King, an author popular with women readers. Stage star Ethel Barrymore, under contract to Metro, appears in her eighth silent feature film, which is now lost.

Plot
As described in a film magazine, Clorinda Gildersleeve (Barrymore) has drifted into an affair with a married man, Leslie Palliser (Ellis). She goes to Europe to forget and meets Malcolm Grant (Davidson), a young surgeon, who falls in love with her. However, because of her affair with Palliser, she believes she has no right to accept his love. She hears an excellent sermon preached by Reverend Arthur Bainbridge (Gillmore) on the text "Woman, go and sin no more" and appeals to the minister in regards to Malcolm's attentions. She sends Malcolm to see the minister, but he does not disclose Clorinda's secret. The minister interests her in a home for erring girls and Clorinda adopts one of the inmates. Reverend Bainbridge urges her to marry Malcolm, but during the ceremony she falls in a faint. That night, however, she writes to the minister announcing her marriage to Malcolm and their departure for France, where he will do surgical work and she will become a nurse.

Cast

Reception
Like many American films of the time, The Lifted Veil was subject to cuts by city and state film censorship boards. The Chicago Board of Censors issued an Adults Only permit for the film.

See also
Ethel Barrymore on stage, screen and radio

References

External links

1917 films
American silent feature films
Films based on Canadian novels
Lost American films
Films directed by George D. Baker
1917 drama films
Silent American drama films
American black-and-white films
1917 lost films
Lost drama films
1910s American films